Mario Stanić (born 10 April 1972) is a former Croatian footballer. Being a versatile offensive player, he was no stranger to any forward or attacking midfield position, and was even deployed as a wing-back in the national team.

Club career
Stanić started his career with Željezničar Sarajevo. He was considered to be one of the most talented young players in former Yugoslavia. In 1992, war began and Stanić escaped to Slavonski Brod wading the Sava and moved to Croatia, where he played for Croatia Zagreb. After only one season, he moved to Spanish Sporting de Gijón, and year later to S.L. Benfica in Portugal. In 1995, he arrived at Club Brugge and was top scorer of the Belgian First Division that year with 20 goals. Then Parma bought him in late 1996 and he played four seasons with that side.

Chelsea
Stanić joined Chelsea on a £5.6 million transfer in June 2000. He became Vialli's third signing, after Jimmy Floyd Hasselbaink and Eiður Guðjohnsen. Stanić made his league debut in a 4–2 home win against West Ham United in August 2000, where he scored a brace, one of them a strike from 35 yards. The goal was later nominated for the Goal of the Season on BBC's Match of the Day programme.

International career
After playing twice for Yugoslavia in 1991, Stanić won 49 international caps and scored seven goals for the Croatian national team between 1995 and 2003, making his international debut in a Euro 1996 qualifier against Estonia in September 1995. He made three appearances for Croatia at the Euro 1996 finals in England and went on to appear in all of the team's seven matches at the 1998 FIFA World Cup finals in France, where they won the bronze medal. At the latter tournament, he scored Croatia's first-ever World Cup goal in their opening 3–1 victory over Jamaica and assisted in Robert Jarni's opening goal in their 3–0 victory over Germany in the quarterfinals. Stanić also made two appearances for Croatia at the 2002 FIFA World Cup finals as a second-half substitute, only to see Croatia fall short of qualifying for the second round of the tournament. His last international appearance came in April 2003 as a half-time substitute in a friendly match against Sweden.

He was forced to retire at the age of 32 after developing a serious knee injury during the 2003–04 league season.

Career statistics

Club

International goals

Honours

Club
Croatia Zagreb
Prva HNL: 1992–93

Club Brugge
Belgian First Division: 1995–96
Belgian Cup: 1995–96

Parma
UEFA Cup: 1998–99
Coppa Italia: 1998–99

Chelsea
FA Charity Shield: 2000

International
Croatia
FIFA World Cup third place: 1998

Individual
Belgian First Division Top Scorer: 1995-96
Franjo Bučar State Award for Sport: 1998

Orders
 Order of Danica Hrvatska with face of Franjo Bučar - 1995
 Order of the Croatian Trefoil - 1998

References

External links
 
 Mario Stanić Yugoslavia stats at Reprezentacija.rs 
 
 
 Profile - Club Brugge

1972 births
Living people
Footballers from Sarajevo
Croats of Bosnia and Herzegovina
Association football forwards
Association football midfielders
Yugoslav footballers
Yugoslavia international footballers
Bosnia and Herzegovina footballers
Croatian footballers
Croatia international footballers
UEFA Euro 1996 players
1998 FIFA World Cup players
2002 FIFA World Cup players
Dual internationalists (football)
FK Željezničar Sarajevo players
GNK Dinamo Zagreb players
Sporting de Gijón players
S.L. Benfica footballers
Club Brugge KV players
Parma Calcio 1913 players
Chelsea F.C. players
UEFA Cup winning players
Yugoslav First League players
Croatian Football League players
La Liga players
Primeira Liga players
Belgian Pro League players
Serie A players
Premier League players
Croatian expatriate footballers
Expatriate footballers in Spain
Expatriate footballers in Portugal
Expatriate footballers in Belgium
Expatriate footballers in Italy
Expatriate footballers in England
Croatian expatriate sportspeople in Spain
Croatian expatriate sportspeople in Portugal
Croatian expatriate sportspeople in Belgium
Croatian expatriate sportspeople in Italy
Croatian expatriate sportspeople in England